Reserve Loan Life Insurance Company is a historic commercial building located at Indianapolis, Indiana.  It was built in 1924–1925, and is a four-story,  Classical Revival style reinforced concrete building, with a three-story, white marble temple front. It features Corinthian order columns. The building was rehabilitated in 1987.  Additional stories were added later and the building converted to a condominium complex.

It was listed on the National Register of Historic Places in 1990.

References

External links

Commercial buildings on the National Register of Historic Places in Indiana
Neoclassical architecture in Indiana
Commercial buildings completed in 1925
Commercial buildings in Indianapolis
National Register of Historic Places in Indianapolis